Villa Sara is a suburb of Treinta y Tres, capital city of the Treinta y Tres Department in eastern Uruguay.

Geography
The suburb is located on Km. 280 of Route 8 and on its intersection with Route 19. The river Río Olimar Grande and the "Park of Río Olimar" to its northeast, separate it from the city.

Population
In 2011 Villa Sara had a population of 1,199.
 
Source: Instituto Nacional de Estadística de Uruguay

References

External links
INE map of Treinta y Tres, Ejido de Treinta y Tres & Villa Sara

Populated places in the Treinta y Tres Department